The Letter Room is a 2020 American short comedy-drama film directed by Elvira Lind. In November 2020, it premiered at HollyShorts Film Festival. It was also nominated for Best Short Film at Tribeca Film Festival and the Palm Springs International ShortFest.

The Letter Room was produced by Sofia Sondervan and executive produced by Oscar Isaac, Elvira Lind, Jason Spire, Ryan Chanatry and Gena Konstantinakos.

Plot 
When a kind-hearted prison officer is transferred to the letter room, he soon gets involved in an inmate's personal affairs.

Cast 
 Oscar Isaac as Richard
 Alia Shawkat as Rosita
 Brian Petsos as Cris
 Tony Gillan as Don
 Michael Hernandez
 Eileen Galindo as Irene
 John Douglas Thompson as Jackson
 Kenneth Heaton as Ray
 Larry Smith as Happy Birthday Singer
 Guillermo Estrada as TV Personality
 William Merrell as Inmate

Awards 
Since its launch, the film has been selected in various festivals around the United States. In February 2021, it made the Live Action Short Film shortlist for the 93rd Academy Awards, and, in March 2021, it was nominated for the Academy Award for Best Live Action Short Film.

References

External links 

 
 The Letter Room (Full Film - Worldwide access) on Vimeo
 The Letter Room (Full Film - United States) on streaming platform Topic.com
 Salaud Morisset, Short Films Production & Distribution
 The Letter Room on Apple TV
 The Letter Room on iTunes

2020 films
2020 short films
American short films
2020 comedy-drama films
2020s English-language films